Garan Rhys Evans (born 16 February 1973) is a Welsh former rugby union footballer, who played as a fullback for Llanelli, the Llanelli Scarlets and Wales.

Evans was born in Trimsaran and educated at Ysgol y Strade in Llanelli.  He made his international debut for Wales on 27 June 1998 in Pretoria against South Africa; the Welsh team were beaten 96–13. Evans did not play for Wales again until 2003, when he was capped against Ireland at Lansdowne Road; Wales lost the match 12–35. He then played in the victory over Scotland.

He was included in Wales' squad at the 2003 Rugby World Cup, but only played for a matter of seconds against New Zealand before suffering a neck injury and having to be stretchered off by paramedics. He retired in 2008. His twin brother, Deiniol, also played for Llanelli RFC.

External links
Llanelli profile
RWC 03 profile
ERC profile

1973 births
Living people
People educated at Ysgol y Strade
Rugby union fullbacks
Rugby union players from Trimsaran
Scarlets players
Wales international rugby union players
Welsh rugby union players